Northern American English may refer to:

 Northern American English, a variety of American English used in the northern United States, comprising:
 North Central American English
 Inland Northern American English
 General American
 Western American English

See also 
 North American English
 Northern America
 Northern England English